Tiszavasvári is a district in western part of Szabolcs-Szatmár-Bereg County. Tiszavasvári is also the name of the town where the district seat is found. The district is located in the Northern Great Plain Statistical Region.

Geography 
Tiszavasvári District borders with Szerencs District and Tokaj District (Borsod-Abaúj-Zemplén County) to the northwest and north, Nyíregyháza District to the north and east, Hajdúböszörmény District and Hajdúnánás District (Hajdú-Bihar County) to the south, Tiszaújváros District (Borsod-Abaúj-Zemplén County) to the west. The number of the inhabited places in Tiszavasvári District is 6.

Municipalities 
The district has 2 towns, 1 large village and 3 villages.
(ordered by population, as of 1 January 2013)

The bolded municipalities are cities, italics municipality is large village.

Demographics

In 2011, it had a population of 27,684 and the population density was 73/km2.

Ethnicity
Besides the Hungarian majority, the main minorities are the Roma (approx. 4,000) and German (150).

Total population (2011 census): 27,684
Ethnic groups (2011 census): Identified themselves: 27,812 persons:
Hungarians: 23,876 (85.85%)
Gypsies: 3,561 (12.80%)
Others and indefinable: 375 (1.35%)
Approx. 150 persons in Tiszavasvári District did declare more than one ethnic group at the 2011 census.

Religion
Religious adherence in the county according to 2011 census:

Reformed – 7,040;
Catholic – 5,877 (Roman Catholic – 4,181; Greek Catholic – 1,696);
Evangelical – 70;
other religions – 348;
Non-religious – 7,011; 
Atheism – 198;
Undeclared – 7,140.

Gallery

See also
List of cities and towns of Hungary

References

External links
 Postal codes of the Tiszavasvári District

Districts in Szabolcs-Szatmár-Bereg County